This is a list of law enforcement agencies in the state of Maine.

According to the US Bureau of Justice Statistics' 2008 Census of State and Local Law Enforcement Agencies, the state had 146 law enforcement agencies employing 2,569 sworn police officers, about 195 for each 100,000 residents.

State agencies

 Maine Department of Corrections
 Maine Department of Inland Fisheries and Wildlife
 Maine Warden Service
 Maine Department of Marine Resources
 Maine Marine Patrol
 Maine Department of Public Safety
 Maine Bureau of Capitol Police
 Maine Drug Enforcement Agency
 Maine State Fire Marshal's Office
 Maine State Police
 Maine Department of Agriculture, Conservation and Forestry
 Maine Forest Service
 Maine Department of the Secretary of State
 Bureau of Motor Vehicles
Division of Enforcement, Anti-Theft and Regulations
 State of Maine Judicial Branch
Office of Judicial Marshals
 Office of the Maine Attorney General
Investigation Division

County agencies 

 Androscoggin County Sheriff's Office
 Aroostook County Sheriff's Office
 Cumberland County Sheriff's Office
 Franklin County Sheriff's Office

 Hancock County Sheriff's Office
 Kennebec County Sheriff's Office
 Knox County Sheriff's Office
 Lincoln County Sheriff's Office

 Oxford County Sheriff's Office
 Penobscot County Sheriff's Office
 Piscataquis County Sheriff's Office
 Sagadahoc County Sheriff's Office

 Somerset County Sheriff's Office
 Waldo County Sheriff's Office
 Washington County Sheriff's Office
 York County Sheriff's Office

Municipal agencies 

 Androscoggin County
 Auburn Police Department
 Lewiston Police Department
 Lisbon Police Department
 Livermore Falls Police Department
 Mechanic Falls Police Department
 Sabattus Police Department
 Aroostook County
 Ashland Police Department
 Caribou Police Department
 Fort Fairfield Police Department
 Fort Kent Police Department
 Houlton Police Department
 Limestone Police Department
 Madawaska Police Department
 Presque Isle Police Department
 Washburn Police Department
 Cumberland County
 Bridgton Police Department
 Brunswick Police Department
 Cape Elizabeth Police Department
 Cumberland Police Department
 Falmouth Police Department
 Freeport Police Department
 Gorham Police Department
 Portland Police Department
 Scarborough Police Department
 South Portland Police Department
 Westbrook Police Department
 Windham Police Department
 Yarmouth Police Department
 Franklin County
 Carrabassett Valley Police Department
 Farmington Police Department
 Jay Police Department
 Rangeley Police Department
 Wilton Police Department

 Hancock County
 Bar Harbor Police Department
 Bucksport Police Department
 Ellsworth Police Department
 Gouldsboro Police Department
 Mount Desert Police Department
 Southwest Harbor Police Department
 Winter Harbor Police Department
 Kennebec County
 Augusta Police Department
 Clinton Police Department
 Gardiner Police Department
 Hallowell Police Department
 Monmouth Police Department
 Oakland Police Department
 Vassalboro Police Department
 Waterville Police Department
 Winthrop Police Department
 Winslow Police Department
 Knox County
 Camden Police Department
 Rockland Police Department
 Rockport Police Department
 Thomaston Police Department
 Lincoln County 
 Boothbay Harbor Police Department
 Damariscotta Police Department
 Waldoboro Police Department
 Wiscasset Police Department

 Oxford County
 Fryeburg Police Department
 Mexico Police Department
 Norway Police Department
 Oxford Police Department
 Paris Police Department
 Rumford Police Department
 Penobscot County
 Bangor Police Department
 Brewer Police Department
 Dexter Police Department
 East Millinocket Police Department
 Hampden Police Department
 Holden Police Department
 Lincoln Police Department
 Newport Police Department
 Old Town Police Department
 Orono Police Department
 Veazie Police Department
 Piscataquis County
 Dover-Foxcroft Police Department
 Greenville Police Department
 Milo Police Department
 Sagadahoc County
 Bath Police Department
 Phippsburg Police Department
 Richmond Police Department
 Topsham Police Department

 Somerset County
 Fairfield Police Department
 Pittsfield Police Department
 Skowhegan Police Department
 Waldo County 
 Belfast Police Department
 Islesboro Law Enforcement Department
 Searsport Police Department
 Stockton Springs Police Department
 Washington County
 Baileyville Police Department
 Calais Police Department
 Eastport Police Department
 Machias Police Department
 Milbridge Police Department
 York County
 Berwick Police Department
 Biddeford Police Department
 Buxton Police Department
 Eliot Police Department
 Kennebunk Police Department
 Kennebunkport Police Department
 Kittery Police Department
 North Berwick Police Department
 Ogunquit Police Department
 Old Orchard Beach Police Department 
 Saco Police Department
 Sanford Police Department
 South Berwick Police Department
 Wells Police Department
 York Police Department

Tribal Police
 Indian Township Police Department
 Passamaquoddy Warden Service
 Penobscot Nation Police Department
 Penobscot Nation Warden Service
 Pleasant Point Police Department

Railroad Police
 Boston and Maine Railroad Police Department
 Canadian Pacific Police Service

Campus Police
 University of Maine Police Department
 University of Southern Maine Police Department
 University of Maine at Farmington Police Department
 University of Maine at Presque Isle Office of Campus Safety and Security

Other
 Baxter State Park Authority Park Rangers
 Two Bridges Regional Jail

References

Maine
Law enforcement agencies of Maine
Law enforcement agencies